Melih Ulueren (born November 14, 1955, İzmir, Turkey) is a Turkish diplomat and ambassador. He was the Turkish Ambassador and Permanent Representative to Nigeria.

He attended and graduated from the Ankara University with a major in the Department of International Relations in 1979. In 1980, Ulueren joined the Ministry of Treasury and the subsequently was assigned to the Ministry of Foreign Affairs, Ankara in 1982. Between 2008-2009, he was elected by the Council of Europe as a member of the Bureau of the European Committee of Migration (CDMG) and conducted the readmission agreement negotiations with the European Union.

In 2010, he was appointed as the Turkish ambassador to Uganda  until 2013. In October 2015, during the Turkey United Nations Convention to Combat Desertification Conference he served as the counsel to the Ministry of Foreign Affairs.

He was appointed the Turkish Ambassador to Nigeria in July 2018, and was replaced in 2021 with Ambassador Hidayet Bayraktar.

References 

Living people
1955 births
21st-century Turkish diplomats
People from İzmir
Ambassadors of Turkey to Nigeria
Ambassadors of Turkey to Uganda